The 2006 season of the 3. divisjon, the fourth-highest association football league for men in Norway.

Between 20 and 22 games (depending on group size) were played in 24 groups, with 3 points given for wins and 1 for draws. Twelve teams were promoted to the 2. divisjon through playoff.

There was a redesigning of the 3. divisjon to better fit geographical boundaries next season. Fewer teams than usual were relegated; purposely none from the Oslo district and none from Agder.

Tables 

Group 1
Fredrikstad 2 – won playoff
Lisleby
KFUM
Follo 2
Klemetsrud
Sparta Sarpsborg 2
St. Hanshaugen
Østsiden
Greåker
Trøgstad/Båstad
Gresvik
Selbak – relegated

Group 2
Kvik/Halden – lost playoff
Moss 2
Kolbotn
Ås
Årvoll
Rygge
Hærland
Sprint-Jeløy 2
Grei
Nesodden
Råde – relegated
Andes

Group 3
Ullern – lost playoff
Skjetten
Lyn 2
Frigg
Fagerborg
Bygdø Monolitten
Fjellhamar
Bjørkelangen
Høland
Bærum 2
Røa
Bøler

Group 4
Strømmen – won playoff
Kongsvinger 2
Aurskog/Finstadbru
Grorud
Blaker
Nordstrand
Sander
Vestli
Galterud
Funnefoss/Vormsund
Lillestrøm 3
Fet

Group 5
Elverum – lost playoff
Skeid 2
Hamar
Eidsvold
Flisa
Trysil
Bjerke
Løten
Rommen
Kjelsås 2
Fart – relegated
Vang – relegated

Group 6
FF Lillehammer – won playoff
Vardal
Ringebu/Fåvang
Ringsaker
Furnes – relegated (voluntarily)
SAFK Fagernes (-> Valdres)
Gjøvik-Lyn 2
Redalen
Stange
Ottestad – relegated
Lom – relegated
Vågå – relegated

Group 7
Mjøndalen – won playoff
Kongsberg
Jevnaker
Hønefoss BK 2
Birkebeineren
Raufoss 2
Ihle
Kolbu/KK
Toten
Hadeland
Hønefoss SK – relegated
Norderhov – relegated

Group 8
Asker – won playoff
Åssiden
Konnerud
Åskollen
Strømsgodset 2
Hauger
Solberg
Svelvik
Vollen
Øvrevoll/Hosle
Holmestrand – relegated
Fossum

Group 9
Sandefjord 2 – lost playoff
Eik-Tønsberg
Runar
Larvik Turn
Sandar
Tønsberg FK
Flint
Fram Larvik
Borre
Sem – relegated
Ivrig – relegated
Tjølling – relegated

Group 10
Pors Grenland 2
Urædd – lost playoff
Grane
Stathelle
Tollnes
Notodden 2
Skarphedin
Skotfoss
Herkules
Brevik
Gvarv
Odd Grenland 3 – relegated

Group 11
FK Arendal – won playoff
Vigør
Vindbjart
Trauma
Søgne
Lyngdal
Tveit
Flekkefjord
Donn
Jerv
Mandalskameratene 2
Våg

Group 12
Vidar – lost playoff
Vardeneset
Egersund
Sandnes Ulf 2
Varhaug
Staal Jørpeland
Sandved
Frøyland
Bryne 2
Ganddal
Bjerkreim
Havørn – relegated

Group 13
Stavanger – won playoff
Randaberg
Buøy
Haugesund 2
Skjold
Ålgård 2
Avaldsnes
Nord
Vaulen
Åkra
Vard Haugesund 2
Vedavåg Karmøy

Group 14
Os – won playoff
Arna-Bjørnar
Radøy/Manger
Frøya
Trio
Sandviken
Brann 2
Bergen Nord
Ny-Krohnborg
Hald
Stord Sunnhordland 2 – relegated
Solid – relegated

Group 15
Hovding – lost playoff
Nest-Sotra
Voss
Follese
Austevoll
Lyngbø
Norheimsund
Loddefjord
Vadmyra
Øygard
Løv-Ham 2 – relegated
Gneist – relegated

Group 16
Stryn – lost playoff
Førde
Sogndal 2
Tornado Måløy
Fjøra
Høyang
Kaupanger
Dale
Eid
Skavøypoll – relegated
Selje – relegated
Sandane – relegated

Group 17
Skarbøvik – lost playoff
Sykkylven
Hareid
Langevåg
Hødd 2
Spjelkavik
Aalesund 2
Volda
Ørsta
Valder
Rollon – relegated
Bergsøy – relegated

Group 18
Averøykameratene – won playoff
Træff
Elnesvågen/Omegn
Surnadal
Sunndal
Gossen – relegated (voluntarily)
Dahle
Kristiansund 2
Midsund
Rival
Eide og Omegn – relegated
Bryn – relegated

Group 19
Nardo – won playoff
Orkla
Tynset
Buvik
Tiller
Nidelv
Strindheim 2
Malvik
Flå
Selbu – relegated
Kvik – relegated
Meldal – relegated

Group 20
Verdal – lost playoff
Stjørdals-Blink
Rørvik
Vuku
NTNUI
Rosenborg 3
Charlottenlund
Namsos
Rissa
Levanger 2
Bjørgan – relegated
Fram – relegated

Group 21
Fauske/Sprint – lost playoff
Innstranden
Mosjøen
Bodø/Glimt 2
Herøy/Dønna
Mo 2
Stålkameratene
Bossmo/Ytteren
Brønnøysund
Meløy – relegated
Junkeren – relegated
Drag – relegated

Group 22
Mjølner – won playoff
Lofoten
Grovfjord
Landsås
Ballangen – relegated (voluntarily)
Harstad 2
Skånland
Morild
Sortland
Medkila
Andenes – relegated (voluntarily)
Leknes

Group 23
Tromsø 2 – won playoff
Fløya
Lyngen/Karnes
Senja
Skjervøy
Ishavsbyen
Bardu
Finnsnes
Tromsdalen 2
Skarp 2
Salangen
Nordreisa – relegated

Group 24
Porsanger – lost playoff
Kirkenes
Alta 2
Norild
Bossekop
Sørøy/Glimt
Kautokeino
Båtsfjord
Nordlys
Tverrelvdalen
Tana Varanger Polar – relegated
Rafsbotn – relegated

Playoffs

References
NIFS

Norwegian Third Division seasons
4
Norway
Norway